Craig Schley is an American politician and activist who serves as representative of West 123 Street Residents’ Association.  He has been a member of the Democratic Party since he was 18 years old.

Education 

In 2003 Schley graduated with a bachelor's degree in political science from New York University and in 2018, he graduated from Mitchell Hamline School of Law as a Thurgood Marshall Scholar.

Advocacy

Media Appearances 

Schley has appeared on New York based radio station WBAI 99.5 FM on political current events. He's also made appearances on other media outlets such as Fox News, Pure Imagination on Progressive Radio Network, Indashio Runway, WHCR 90.3 FM Harlem based community radio station and is a frequent guest and commentator on Black Empowerment radio show on BlogTalkRadio. In addition, Schley is a contributor to the Black Star News electronic and print media.

Harlem Re-Zoning Activism 
In 2008, the City Planning Commission Chair, Amanda Burden announced the rezoning of 125th Street (Manhattan) and declaring “this comprehensive initiative will fulfill the promise of Harlem's ‘Main Street’ as a vibrant corridor and a premier arts, entertainment and commercial destination in [New York] city.” The zoning changes proposed allowances for taller buildings, thereby increasing the density for homes and encouraging the support of artistic and cultural spaces by limiting the street presence of banks and other “non-active” businesses to encourage more pedestrians in the area. The plan would affect the 24 square blocks between 124th and 126th Streets, from Broadway to Second Avenue.

As Executive Director of VFPC, Schley fought against the re-zoning proposal, arguing that the city “had not sought the input of the actual community” when it put together the proposal and that the current proposal does not adequately protect or serve the interest of the local community or the historic character of the commercial district. Schley and the VOTE People research team found a century-old clause in the City Charter that could slow the rezoning process. The clause says that if the owners of at least 20% of the land either adjacent to or across from the area being rezoned disapprove of the development, 75% - not a simple majority of the Council must approve the rezoning for the process to continue. This stalled the rezoning plan and construction of any kind had to cease and attracted attention of the City Planning Commission, media and the broader community. VOTE People legally challenged the appeals in court twice. Despite efforts, they were unsuccessful in securing the necessary monetary and legal resources which was essential to effectively wage to overturn the Harlem re-zoning scheme which eventually was given the go-ahead.

During the Occupy Wall Street movement which spread to Harlem, Schley suggested that problems in northern Manhattan differ compared with those of Wall Street; rather than finance, they are community-based concerns. "If we are going to step out and occupy Harlem, we need to make sure we're going to occupy the needs of this community. And let's make it clear: You can't do it unabashed. When African Americans step out there, things tend to get hostile."

Early life 
Schley was born in Philadelphia, Pennsylvania. He grew up in a lower middle class neighborhood in Philadelphia. Despite not being afforded the right educational tools to fulfill his dreams he overcame substantial hurdles, seeking to turn setbacks into triumphs.

Early career 
Before attending college, Schley moved away from Philadelphia seeking opportunities to build vocational skills, he landed an electrician apprenticeship for the International Brotherhood of Electrical Workers in Atlanta, Georgia. Schley later became a member of IAFF Local 1492 and served the public as a firefighter for Dekalb County, Georgia.

Schley moved to New York City to attend NYU where he paid his way through university by modeling for Wilhelmina modeling agency.

Campaign(s) 
Schley’s first introduction to Democratic Party politics was first as an intern for Bronx Borough President and Democratic Party nominee for Mayor Freddy Ferrer. Shortly thereafter he began working as an intern managing the housing and social security constituent queries for former congressman Charles Rangel. Schley became the political strategist for Felipe Luciano during his bid for office; consulting for and coordinating field operations for City Councilor Verna Tyler in Philadelphia’s 17th Ward.

In 2008 Craig launched his first political campaign when he ran for congress challenging the Democratic stalwart Charles Rangel for the 13th Congressional District of New York.

In January 2010, Schley ran for congress again as an Independent and Vote People for Change line.

In 2012, Schley ran for congress this time as a Democrat while being endorsed by the Republican Party in the newly-drawn 13th Congressional District of New York. Although he was unsuccessful in his electoral bid, Schley garnered 12,132 votes.

Inspired by his great-grandfather, Luke Grady, who, after reconstruction, taught himself how to read and became North Carolina’s first African-American State Legislator. Schley seeks to carry on Grady’s tradition of serving others in their government, and aims to represent the people in the  New York State Assembly’s 70th District, where he has resided and served for nearly 20 years.

Award(s) 
Schley was recognized by Harlem Children’s Zone on two separate occasions receiving the Community Pride Award in August 2007 and In March 2009 the Initiative for Manhood Award.

In 2011 Schley was awarded for outstanding generosity and dedication by the VAG where he worked and assisted with the organizational structure, acted as a liaison and raised funds for the Youth Summit Program (an initiative to address violence among the youth).

In 2012 The Veterans Action Network awarded Schley with the Veteran's Housing Advocate Award.

References

1963 births
Living people
Politicians from Philadelphia
American radio personalities